Robert J. MacDonald (1914-1987) was a politician in the state of Michigan.

Biography
MacDonald was born on April 28, 1914 in Superior, Wisconsin to Duncan and Cecilia MacDonald He was known to be a member of the Benevolent and Protective Order of Elks, Lions Clubs International, and the Fraternal Order of Eagles. MacDonald died in 1987.

Career
From 1941 to 1944 MacDonald served as a member of the Michigan House of Representatives. Later, he served in the Michigan State Senate from 1945 to 1946. By trade he was a lawyer, with his office in the historical Paterson Building.
]

References

1914 births
1987 deaths
Politicians from Superior, Wisconsin
Democratic Party Michigan state senators
Democratic Party members of the Michigan House of Representatives
20th-century American politicians